The 1973 Wirral Metropolitan Borough Council election took place on 10 May 1973 to elect members of Wirral Metropolitan Borough Council in England. This was on the same day as other local elections.

The election took place a year before the council formally coming into its powers and prior to the creation of the Metropolitan Borough of Wirral on 1 April 1974 under the Local Government Act 1972, as a merger of the county boroughs of Birkenhead and Wallasey, along with the municipal borough of Bebington and the urban districts of Hoylake and Wirral.

After the election, the composition of the council was:

Election results

Overall election result

New Council.

Ward results

Birkenhead

No. 1 (Argyle-Clifton-Holt)

No. 2 (Bebington and Mersey)

No. 3 (Cathcart-Claughton-Cleveland)

No. 4 (Devonshire and Egerton)

No. 5 (Gilbrook and St James)

No. 6 (Grange and Oxton)

No. 7 (Prenton)

No. 8 (Upton)

Wallasey

No. 9 (Leasowe)

No. 10 (Marlowe-Egremont-South Liscard)

No. 11 (Moreton and Saughall Massie)

No. 12 (New Brighton-Wallasey-Warren)

No. 13 (North Liscard-Upper Brighton Street)

No. 14 (Seacombe-Poulton-Somerville)

Bebington

No. 15 (Higher Bebington and Woodhey)

No. 16 (Park-New Ferry-North Bromborough)

No. 17 (South Bromborough and Eastham)

No. 18 (Lower Bebington and Poulton)

Hoylake

No. 19 (Caldy and Frankby)

No. 20 (Central-Hoose-Meols-Park)

Wirral

No. 21 (Barnston-Gayton-Heswall-Oldfield)

No. 22 (Irby-Pensby-Thurstaston)

Notes

• bold denotes the winning candidate

References

1973 English local elections
1973
1970s in Merseyside